The Nordic Council of Ministers is an intergovernmental forum established after the Helsinki Treaty. The purpose of the Nordic Council of Ministers is to complement the Nordic Council and promote Nordic cooperation.

Structure 
The governments of the Nordic countries each have a Minister for Nordic Cooperation. This responsibility often goes to the Minister of Foreign Affairs or another ministerial post that the Nordic country has a special desire for cooperation. These Ministers for Nordic Cooperation delegate meetings for other Ministers to discuss avenues for cooperation in the minister's respective fields, thus the Ministers for Cooperation set up Ministerial Councils. Hence the name, Council of Ministers.

Cooperation with other International Organizations 
The Council and the Council of Ministers are involved in various forms of cooperation with neighbouring areas, amongst them being the Baltic Assembly and the Benelux, as well as Russia and Schleswig-Holstein. The Council of Ministers has offices in the following countries: 

Closed offices

Programmes
Nordic Council of Ministers's educational programme for lifelong learning is "Nordplus". The main objective of the programme is to strengthen and develop Nordic educational cooperation.

See also
Valhalla (youth portal)

References

Nordic Council